George Ernest Ilsley (14 March 1928 – 8 April 2016) was an Australian rules footballer who played with Carlton in the Victorian Football League (VFL), Eaglehawk Football Club in the Bendigo Football League and Northern United in the Golden City Football League.

Ilsley played over 350 games for the Eaglehawk Football Club and also coached them.  He was a Life member and Hall of Fame member of both Eaglehawk and the Bendigo Football League. He was named as centre half-forward in Eaglehawk's team of the century and the Eaglehawk best and fairest award is named the George Ilsley Medal.

Notes

External links 

George Ilsley's profile at Blueseum

1928 births
2016 deaths
Carlton Football Club players
Eaglehawk Football Club players
Australian rules footballers from Victoria (Australia)